Agudelle is a commune in the Charente-Maritime department in the Nouvelle-Aquitaine region of southwestern France.

Geography
Agudelle is located some 7 km south by south-west of Jonzac and 10 km east of Mirambeau. It can be accessed by the D153 road from Nieul-le-Virouil in the west to the village then continuing east to join the D19 road. There is also the D154E1 from Salignac-de-Mirambeau in the south through the commune to the village. There is a network of country roads covering the whole commune. The commune is mostly farmland with a large forest in the north and patches of forest in the south. Apart from the village there is also the hamlet of Chez Nicoleau in the south of the commune. The altitude varies from 47 to 77 metres above sea level.

The western border of the commune consists of a stream which flows into the Etang d'Allas just outside the north-western border of the commune. The eastern border of the commune is delineated by the Maine stream which flows north.

Neighbouring communes and villages

History
In the 12th century Agudelle forest belonged to the Order of Fontevraud. The chapel was given to Lambert, the founder of the Abbey of Our Lady of the Crown in 1116 to establish a priory.

Administration

List of Successive Mayors of Agudelle

Canton
Agudelle is part of the Canton of Jonzac together with 19 other communes.

Inter-Communality
Agudelle part of the Community of communes of Haute-Saintonge. This group includes 123 communes in the south of Charente-Maritime and is the largest intercommunal structure in France.

Population

Distribution of Age Groups

Percentage Distribution of Age Groups in Agudelle and Charente-Maririme Department in 2017

Source: INSEE

Economy
The main product of the commune is grapes for cognac and Pineau des Charentes.

Sites and Monuments

The Church of Saint Eutropius (12th century) has been listed as a historical monument since 31 December 1986. The church contains two items that are registered as historical objects:
A Statue: Saint Eutropius (17th century) in polychrome wood.
A Bronze Bell (1556)
The Tower House dates from the 19th century.

See also
Communes of the Charente-Maritime department

References

External links
Agudelle on Géoportail, National Geographic Institute (IGN) website 
Agudelle on the 1750 Cassini Map

Communes of Charente-Maritime